Grams is the plural of gram, a unit of mass. It may also refer to:

People
 Martin Grams Jr. (born 1977), American pop culture historian
 Natalie Grams (born 1978), German physician, author and former homeopath who now criticizes the pseudoscience
 Oleg Grams (born 1984), Russian handball player
 Rod Grams (1948–2013), American politician
 Wolfgang Grams (1953–1993), a member of the Red Army Faction terrorist group

Other uses
 Grams (search), a discontinued darknet search engine

See also
 Gram (disambiguation)